Matthew Oliver Ricketts (April 3, 1858 –  January 3, 1917) was an American politician and physician. He was the first African-American member of the Nebraska Legislature, where he served two terms in the Nebraska House of Representatives (the lower house of what was then a bicameral legislature) from 1893 until 1897. He was also the first African American to graduate from the University of Nebraska College of Medicine in Omaha.

Biography

Early years
Ricketts was born to enslaved parents in Henry County, Kentucky in 1858. His parents moved to Boonville, Missouri, after the American Civil War when he was a child, and he completed school there.

In 1876 Ricketts earned a degree from the Lincoln Institute (now Lincoln University of Missouri) in Jefferson City, Missouri. In 1880 he moved to Omaha, where he was admitted to the Omaha Medical College.  He worked as a janitor to pay his tuition. In March 1884 Ricketts graduated with honors, and soon after opened a medical office in Omaha.

Career
Ricketts quickly earned a reputation for "being a very careful physician, as well as an exceedingly likable young man."  With his education and energy, Ricketts became the acknowledged leader of Omaha's African-American community.  He was a charismatic man and controversial speaker.

Following the failed candidacy of Nebraska's first black candidate, Edwin R. Overall, in 1890, Ricketts was elected to the Nebraska House of Representatives in 1892 on the Republican ticket. Rickets served two terms, from 1893 to 1897. He was the first African American to serve in the Nebraska Legislature. Dr. Ricketts was regarded as one of the best orators there and was frequently called upon for his opinions.

He is credited with creating Omaha's Negro Fire Department Company.  He helped secure appointments for blacks in city and state government positions, for patronage was an important part of politics before the establishment of merit career civil service for such positions. Ricketts was a member of the black association the Prince Hal Masons, where he was elected Worshipful Master of Omaha Excelsior Lodge No. 110.  The African-American Masons were one of many fraternal associations created by African Americans in communities nationwide in the late 19th century as they organized new cooperative ventures. Ricketts addressed the 1906 Grand Convocation of the Freemasons in Kansas City, Missouri.

After leaving the Legislature, Ricketts was an unsuccessful candidate for a federal appointee position, chiefly because his appointment was opposed by a Nebraska congressman. Ricketts subsequently moved to St. Joseph, Missouri to continue his medical career in 1903. He practiced there for another 14 years and continued to play a prominent role in politics in that city.

Ricketts was active in the Nebraska Legislature, chairing several committees and temporarily chairing the body. He introduced a bill to legalize interracial marriages, which passed the Legislature only to be vetoed by Governor Silas A. Holcomb.  He also introduced a bill to prohibit the denial of public services to African Americans. In 1893 Nebraska lawmakers passed a measure prohibiting race-based denial of services. This strengthening of the state's 1885 civil rights law was led by Ricketts. He was also instrumental in the enactment of a bill that set an age of consent for marriage in Nebraska, relying on a petition of 500 African-American women in Omaha to carry it forward.

Personal life
In 1884 when he graduated from medical school, Ricketts married Alice Nelson.  They had three children. Ricketts died in St. Joseph, Missouri, at the age of 64.

See also
 African Americans in Omaha, Nebraska
 History of Omaha
 African-American officeholders during and following the Reconstruction era

References

1858 births
1917 deaths
People from Henry County, Kentucky
African-American state legislators in Nebraska
Republican Party members of the Nebraska House of Representatives
Politicians from Omaha, Nebraska
People from Omaha, Nebraska
University of Nebraska Medical Center alumni
African-American life in Omaha, Nebraska
African-American physicians
Physicians from Nebraska
19th-century American politicians
Janitors
American freedmen
20th-century African-American people
Black conservatism in the United States